R-158 (Р-158) is a portable VHF radio transceiver which entered service with the Soviet military in 1979. It was designed for use at platoon level.

Technical specifications
Frequency modulation
Operating modes: Radio telephone and tone calling
Frequency range: 30 - 79.975 MHz  
Tuning system: PLL frequency synthesis with 25 kHz steps, selected via rotary switches 
2000 total available channels 
Sensitivity (at a signal-to-noise ratio of 20 dB): 1 μV 
Superheterodyne with two frequency transformations
Intermediate frequencies: 1st IF - 11.5 MHz; 2nd IF - 1.5 MHz 
RF output power: 1 Watt 
Frequency deviation: 5 kHz 
Spurious emission suppression: 45 dB 
Communication range:
With AШ-1.5 (Kulikov's pin antenna) - up to 4 km
With λ-shaped antenna - up to 10 km
Power supply: Nickel-cadmium battery type 10NKGC-1D (10НКГЦ-1Д) at 12 volts, or from a 12 volt vehicle supply 
Current consumption: Receiving mode 60 mA, transmission mode 580 mA
Operating temperature range: -40 to + 50 °C
Overall dimensions: 80 х 165 х 263 mm
Weight of the radio: 3.6 kg
Transistorized circuitry

References

External links 
 http://www.greenradio.de/e_r158.htm
 http://ru.pc-history.com/radiostanciya-r-158.html

Military electronics of Russia
Military radio systems
Radio in the Soviet Union